Louis Bernard Gaskin (born March 11, 1967) is an American convicted murderer who was sentenced to death in Florida for the murders of Robert and Georgette Sturmfels and the attempted murders of Joseph and Mary Rector that all occurred on the night of December 20, 1989. He is popularly known as the Ninja killer because he dressed in a full black ninja outfit to avoid identification.

Murders 
On the night of December 20, 1989, Gaskin walked up to the home of 56-year-old Robert and 55-year-old Georgette Sturmfels with a .22 Caliber rifle and wearing a complete black ninja outfit to avoid identification. Gaskin circled the home to the back window, where Robert was sitting in a recliner, and Georgette sat on the sofa. Gaskin fired his gun, shooting Robert five times, killing him, and shooting Georgette once. Georgette was still alive on the first shot, so Gaskin reloaded his gun and shot Georgette in the head, killing her.

A few hours later, Gaskin drove up to the home of Joseph and Mary Rector. As the Rector's watched the television, Gaskin unloaded his rifle into the home, hitting Joseph. Joseph was able to run out of the room. Mary and Joseph took cover in a closet until they heard Gaskin smash the back window, so they ran out to the car, where Gaskin started firing at them from inside the house. All of the bullets missed, and the Rectors were able to get in their car and drive away to a nearby hospital. The police were called, and after a search of the home, it was clear the perpetrator had ransacked it.

When the murders became public, Gaskin became a suspect almost immediately after his girlfriend's cousin implicated Gaskin in the killings, saying that Gaskin came home soon after the killings and said he was wrapping some "presents."

Arrest and conviction 
Gaskin was arrested on December 30. Initially, he denied any involvement in the murders. However, he later confessed to the murders and said the killings were completely random. He confessed in a taped statement to having urges to kill. He also confessed to killing a coworker back in 1986, though this is unconfirmed. After a search of Gaskin's home, the "presents" were determined to be initially from the Sturmfels property. After a two-month trial in July 1990, Gaskin was found guilty of two counts of first-degree murder and two counts of attempted murder, and he was given two death sentences. He is currently incarcerated at the Florida State Prison in Raiford, Florida.

On March 13, 2023, Governor Ron DeSantis signed Gaskin's death warrant for April 12, 2023.

See also 
 List of death row inmates in the United States
 List of people scheduled to be executed in the United States

References 

1967 births
20th-century American criminals
American male criminals
American people convicted of attempted murder
American people convicted of murder
Criminals from Florida
Living people
People convicted of murder by Florida
Prisoners sentenced to death by Florida
Suspected serial killers